Good Old Boys may refer to:

 Old boy network, a kind of interpersonal relationship among friends who do business together
 The Good Old Boys (film), a 1995 TV movie directed by Tommy Lee Jones
 Good Old Boys (Randy Newman album), 1974
 Good Old Boys (John Hartford album), 1999
 "Theme from The Dukes of Hazzard (Good Ol' Boys)", 1980 single by Waylon Jennings
 Good Ol' Boys, a 1994 album from The Bob & Tom Show
 The Good Ol' Boys, a fictional band featured in The Blues Brothers
 "Good Ol' Boys", a song by Child's Play from the EP Ruff House